Anwarmiya Ajamiya Kaji (1843 ― 22 October 1916) was a poet from Gujarat, India.

Biography 
Anwarmiya was born in 1843 in Visnagar to Ajamiya Anumiya. His family had roots in Arabia who moved to Patan and served as Kaji (local judge). They were granted Visnagar for activity so they settled there. Anwarmiya had interest in spirituality since his childhood. At the age of 12, he served Premmast Saiyyd Saheb when he visited Visnagar and had deep influence of him. Initially resided at lonely places but later moved to old mosque in Kajiwada on insistence of his relatives and followers. He visited Mecca and Madina in 1881. He contracted illness and moved to Palanpur where he died on 22 October 1916. A mausoleum was built over his resting place and the Urs is organised there every year.

Works
Anwarmiya Kaji had knowledge of six orthodox schools of Hindu philosophy  and Yoga. His  Anwarkavya includes several spiritual poems about Bhakti. He composed in Gujarati as well as Urdu. His poetry defines Bhakti in form of Sufism. He has also composed devotional hymns of Rama and Krishna.

See also
 List of Gujarati-language writers

References

Gujarati people
Gujarati-language writers
1843 births
1916 deaths
People from Banaskantha district
People from British India
Bhakti movement
Gujarati-language poets